Chagulak Island (also spelled Chugul, Chugula, Chegoula, or Tchougoulok) is a small, uninhabited volcanic island in the Islands of Four Mountains group in the Aleutian Islands of southwestern Alaska, United States. The -wide island consists of a single cone that reaches an elevation of 3,747 ft (1,142 m). No eruptions have been recorded and very little is known about the volcano, as the only study done on Chagulak so far is a single chemical analysis of a "low-potassium, high-alumina basaltic andesite" from the north shore.

Gallery

References

Islands of Four Mountains
Uninhabited islands of Alaska
Islands of Alaska
Islands of Unorganized Borough, Alaska
Volcanoes of Alaska
Holocene stratovolcanoes